"Sunshine" is a song produced by French DJ David Guetta and Swedish DJ Avicii, from Guetta's fifth studio album, Nothing but the Beat. It entered the Swedish Charts at number 59. It was also nominated for a Grammy Award for Best Dance Recording.

Background
'Sunshine' is a progressive house song written in the key of C# minor. It follows the chord progression of C#m/B/E-A/B/C# and runs at 128 bpm.

Track listing

Credits and personnel
Credits adapted from the liner notes for Nothing but the Beat.

David Guetta – songwriting, production, mixing
Tim Bergling (Avicii)– songwriting, production, mixing
Giorgio Tuinfort – songwriting, production

Charts

References

2011 singles
Avicii songs
David Guetta songs
Instrumentals
Song recordings produced by Avicii
Songs written by David Guetta
Songs written by Giorgio Tuinfort
Song recordings produced by David Guetta